The Technopolis Innovation Park Delft (or Technopolis) is a science park in Delft, Netherlands started in 2005.

Technopolis is next to the campus of Delft University of Technology. The park covers 70 hectares (168 acres) which is available for companies and institutes conducting research and development.

See also
 Business cluster

References

External links 
http://www.technopolispark.nl

Delft University of Technology
Science parks in the Netherlands